Caludon Castle School is an academy in Wyken, Coventry, England.  The school was founded in 1954 as a boys' comprehensive school, but is now a co-educational 11-18 comprehensive school with a sixth form. In September 2004, the school was designated as a Business and Enterprise College, by the Specialist Schools and Academies Trust.
The previous buildings dating from the 1950s were demolished to make way for a new £24 million PFI project resulting in the school being totally rebuilt. The school is situated on a  site.

Notable staff

Former
Tom O'Carroll (born 1945), paedophilia advocate

Notable alumni 
 Adam Balding (born 7 December 1979), Rugby Union player with Newcastle Falcons
 Stan Cowley, FRS (born 1947), Professor of Solar Planetary Physics at the University of Leicester.
 Ron Cook (born 1948), actor
 Marlon Devonish (born 1 June 1976), Olympic gold medalist - 4 × 100 m - Athens 2004, World Indoor Champion - 200m - 2003.
 Ian Evatt (born 19 November 1981) footballer
 Bobby Gould (born 12 June 1946), former footballer who is now a manager.
 Paul King (born 20 November 1960), British singer, musician, VJ, and TV presenter. Member of the mid 80's band 'King'.
 Guy James (born 23 May 1970), West End Actor and Musician, member of band 'Jackdaw4', now Theatre Producer of The Osmonds Musical and The Addams Family and Creator of MoxieRadio.Online. 
 James Maddison (born 1996), Footballer for Leicester City
 Ian Muir (born 5 May 1963), former footballer
 Bobby Parker (born 11 November 1952), former footballer
 Rachel Smith (born 1993), Captain of the GB Rhythmic Gymnastic Team, 2012 Olympics
 Jamie Paterson (born 1991), Professional football player, currently playing for Swansea, formerly of Bristol City, Nottingham Forest, Huddersfield and Walsall

References

Academies in Coventry
Educational institutions established in 1954
Secondary schools in Coventry
1954 establishments in England